Laurence of Siponto, also known as Laurence Maioranus (d. 7 February, c. 545), is an Italian saint, patron of the city of Manfredonia and the Archdiocese of Manfredonia-Vieste-San Giovanni Rotondo. Manfredonia Cathedral is dedicated to him. He is credited with founded the shrine to Saint Michael the Archangel on Mount Gargano.

Life
According to a ninth century "vita", Laurence was from Constantinople. The bishopric of Siponto being vacant, the residents sent to Constantinople for a successor. Around 491 Emperor Zeno appointed his relative Laurence. It is not clear whether Laurence was consecrated bishop in Constantinople or in Rome by Pope Gelasius I. Laurence arrived in Siponto, bringing with him the relics of Saint Agatha and Saint Stephen.

Shortly after his appointment in 491 he received the visions of Saint Michael which led to the establishment of the shrine of Monte Gargano.

Saint Laurence is patron of the city of Manfredonia. His relics are now in Cattedrale di San Lorenzo Maiorano, where they were translated in 1327 by Bishop Matteo Orsini from Siponto Cathedral where they lay under the high altar. During the fire and the destruction of the first cathedral by the Turks in 1620, the body of Saint Laurence was also destroyed, except for the right arm, which remains in the cathedral today. His feast is on 7 February.

References

Sources and external links
 Catholic.org: summary biography
 Vailati, Valentino, 1990: San Lorenzo Maiorano vescovo e protagonista nella storia di Manfredonia. Edizioni del Golfo

Italian saints
Bishops in Apulia
6th-century Christian saints
540s deaths
People from Manfredonia
Year of birth unknown